The 2022–23 season is the 118th season of competitive football in Turkey.

Pre-season

League tables

Süper Lig

1.Lig

Turkish Cup

National team

Friendlies

2023–23 UEFA Nations League

UEFA Euro 2024 qualification

Turkish clubs in Europe

UEFA Champions League

Second qualifying round

Play-off round

UEFA Europa League

Play-off round

Group stage

Group B

Group H

Knockout stage

Round of 16

UEFA Europa Conference League

Second qualifying round

Third qualifying round

Play-off round

Group stage

Group A

Group G

Knockout stage

Knockout round play-offs

Round of 16

|}

References 

 
Seasons in Turkish football
Turkish 2022